The 1937 Palestine League was the fifth season of league football in the British Mandate for Palestine. The defending champions were Maccabi Tel Aviv.

Since due to the 1936–1939 Arab revolt the previous season ended at December 1936, the season started on 29 January 1937, playing the league in the spring-autumn format. Further delays caused this season to end on 27 November 1937, despite only five teams taking part in the league.

The championship was won by defending champions Maccabi Tel Aviv.

League table

See also
 1937 Liga Bet

References
RSSSF
100 Years of Football 1906-2006, Elisha Shohat (Israel), 2006

Palestine League seasons
Palestine
Palestine
1
1